Dr Ruth Segomotsi Mompati District Municipality (formerly Bophirima District Municipality) is one of the 4 districts of North West province of South Africa. The seat of Mompati District is Vryburg. The majority of its 439,637 people speak Setswana (2001 Census). The district code is DC39.  It is South Africa's largest beef producing district, with Hereford cattle the most popular. It is sometimes called "the Texas of South Africa". Maize and peanuts are important crops produced in the district. The district was renamed after the former Mayor of Vryburg Ruth Mompati.

Geography

Neighbours
Mompati District is surrounded (clockwise) by:
 the republic of Botswana to the north
 Ngaka Modiri Molema District Municipality to the north-east
 Dr Kenneth Kaunda District Municipality to the south-east
 Lejweleputswa District Municipality (Free State province) to the south-east
 Frances Baard District Municipality (Northern Cape province) to the south
 Kgalagadi District Municipality (Northern Cape province) to the west

Local municipalities
The district contains the following 5 local municipalities:

Demographics
The following statistics are from the 2011 census.

Gender

Ethnic group

Age

Politics

Election results
Election results for Mompati District in the South African general election, 2004. 
 Population 18 and over: 245 386 (55.82% of total population)
 Total votes: 153 517 (34.92% of total population)
 Voting % estimate: 62.56% votes as a % of population 18 and over

Results From Local Government Election 2021 

Dr Ruth Segomotsi Mompati - Municipal election results

References

External links
 Bophirima DM Official Website

District Municipalities of North West (South African province)
Dr Ruth Segomotsi Mompati District Municipality